Death of a Superhero is a 2011 Irish drama film based on the New Zealand novel of the same name by Anthony McCarten. Originally planned to be directed by McCarten in New Zealand, the film was shot on location in Ireland throughout 2010 and was directed by Ian FitzGibbon. The film stars Thomas Sangster alongside Andy Serkis. It tells the story of a dying 15-year-old boy who draws comic book stories of an invincible superhero as he struggles with his mortality.

Plot
In the first scene, 15-year-old Don (Sangster) attempts suicide by the train tracks or gives the viewer the impression he intends to commit suicide. However, he lets the train rush past him and simply watches.

The next scene shows him getting therapy in a brightly coloured room. Don appears to have tuned out the therapist and simply jots down a drawing in his notebook. He then tears the page from his book and walks out the room leaving a puzzled therapist who eyes his drawing which features the therapist going 'bla bla bla bla bla'.

Don asks his brother about his relationship with someone who his brother thinks fondly of. His brother seems happy with her.

Don is a talented teenager who draws a lot of comic stories and since being told he had terminal cancer has lived in a world occupied by his superhero. Don frequently suffers from hallucinations and during a scan, sees a twisted woman (a cartoon and figment of his imagination) laughing hideously at him.

In the reception room, a boy named Billy won't stop staring at Don. Don is drawing a picture and then rips it out of his book and hands it to Billy, getting up and leaving. It is a picture of a boy standing in a hole in a cemetery. Behind him there is a grave with the name 'Billy' written on it.

In an effort to stop his suicide attempts, his parents send him to therapy. Eventually, he is sent to see a psychiatrist, Dr. Adrian King (Andy Serkis), one whom he initially does not like; but whom he forms a bond with quickly.

Don walks home from school alone and balances on the wall of a bridge as cars rush past below him. He cautiously walks across, unaware that he has been spotted by the therapist.

Don visually shows the therapist his opinion on his methods when he graffiti's a Skull 'n' Crossbones on his boat. However, later Don comes and cleans it off for him and his therapist offers love advice for his crush Shelly.

Shelly reads out an essay from her book. Don looks at it and realises she has not done her homework and is left amazed. The teacher is on the phone and has not been listening to her. On the way out of the classroom, Don tells her: 'nice essay' and she smiles knowing he knows too.

Don turns up at a party where he and his friends perfect a recipe for a drink made from alcoholic wines and beers. Grinning, Don takes a sip. On the way home he spots the woman again and it shows him spraying the air with something. In the morning there is graffitied woman on the school window which people crowd around taking pictures of. His parents are infuriated and he has been suspended from school for  a week. Eventually, he is made to scrub it off and so does so when unexpectedly, Shelly kneels down and helps him.

Don returns to the therapist and notices a picture of Dr. King's wife who died a while ago.

During an English lesson Don and Shelly pass notes between each other and end up deciding to attend a party on the weekend. Don asks his therapist for 'love advice' and attends the party with Shelly. Before the party they both talk on top of a building admiring the view. Shelly tells Don she likes his drawings. Flattered, Don tells her she is the smartest girl in the class and really beautiful. Shelly does not think that is a 'talent' and would do anything for a talent like Don's. The party goes well until they discover a video of Shelly exposing her breasts and lying on the floor and beginning to strip off her clothes. Some one tells Don his girlfriend is 'dirty' and 'crazy' - intended as a joke. Embarrassed, Don claims she is not his girlfriend and they hardly know each other. Then he spots Shelly, who has heard what he said. She drives off on her motorbike without him.

Don arrives home panicking and heartbroken and is then spotted by his therapist who asks him what's wrong. Don tells him to go away and leave shouting loudly. It results with him having a panic attack and needing to be rushed to the hospital. Don is informed his cancer has got worse and has only a few days left to live. His father decides to spend some time with his son smoking and the two get very emotional. When Don's mother finds out she tells the father to drive him to hospital.

Don has a conversation with a younger patient who has cancer too. She claims she wants to be a dancer when she is older. Billy says he'll be a prince and Don reveals he wants to be a superhero.

Don's brother confesses to Don's friend that he does not want Don to die a virgin. They go around the school asking girls if they will have sex with Don, but all of them say that it sounds gross. Eventually, they find some girls who are attractive and willing. Don is embarrassed when they show him pictures of the girls and ask for him to pick one. Realising they've asked the majority of the girls in the school, Don hesitates. However, with the help of his therapist, they get one to agree.

Don is completely nervous during his conversation with the girl and they stumble across the subject of 'true love'. She then asks Don to show her some of his pictures. She is impressed and tells him she would do anything for a talent like his. He is reminded of Shelly. In a hallucination he sees the medic woman who tried to kill him with a kiss. He leaves the girl, goes to Shelly and apologises.

The two walk along a beach, hand in hand. Don makes her promise that if she's ever upset then she should go there and think of him, which she promises to do. The scene then fades to show Don on his bed dying in peace.

Don’s therapist boards his sailboat, which he has painted a Skull 'n' Crossbones on similar to that drawn by Don. Shelly is shown on a rock by the waterside as the sailboat sails in the distance.

Cast
 Andy Serkis as Dr. Adrian King
 Thomas Sangster as Donald Clarke
 Aisling Loftus as Shelly
 Michael McElhatton as James Clarke
 Sharon Horgan as Renata Clarke
 Jessica Schwarz as Tanya
 Ronan Raftery as Jeff
 Killian Coyle as Hugo 
 Ben Harding as Michael 
 Jane Brennan as Dr. Rebecca Johnston

Production
Development of the project was announced in 2008, with it being reported that Anthony McCarten was to direct his adaptation of his own novel. McCarten hoped the film would be shot in New Zealand after receiving German funding and also considered the big names it could draw in. In February 2009, it was announced that Freddie Highmore was to join the cast as the central character and that filming was to begin later in the year. After the involvement of Grand Pictures and the Irish Film Board, the film's setting moved from New Zealand to Dublin, with Ian Fitzgibbon signing on as director. Highmore left the role and was replaced by Thomas Sangster, with Andy Serkis also signing on. The film was shot throughout 2010 in Ireland, with principal photography wrapping in December 2010. In October 2011, Tribeca Film purchased the North American distribution rights for the film during its world premiere at the Toronto Film Festival where it was an Official Selection. The film will be released in 2012 after its US premiere at the Tribeca Film Festival. Prior to this the film won the Audience Award and Young Jury Award at the 2011 European Film Festival.

Reception
The film received positive reviews, with Variety praising the cast, specifically Sangster and Serkis.
It won the People's Choice Award and the Young Jury Award at the 2011 Les Arcs European Film Festival.
The film has also won the Audience Award and 'Special Mention' of the Jury at the Mamer-en-Mars European Film Festival 

It has appeared on the Irish Leaving Certificate Examination English syllabus.

References

External links
 

Films based on New Zealand novels
Films directed by Ian Fitzgibbon
Films set in England
Films about cancer
Films with screenplays by Anthony McCarten
2011 films
2011 drama films
English-language German films
Films about comics
German drama films
Films shot in Ireland
2010s English-language films
2010s German films